Grand Ayatollah Sayyid Mohammad Baqir Shirazi (Persian:  السيد محمد باقر شيرازي‎; 26 November 1931 – 13 May 2014) was an Iranian Twelver Shi'a Marja. He was the highest-ranking Shia marja in Iran and Iraq.

Personal life
Shirazi was born on 26 November 1931 in Iran. He died in Imam Reza (AS) Hospital in Tehran on 15 May 2014, aged 82.

Education
Shirazi studied in the seminaries of Najaf, Iraq under Grand Ayatollah Abul-Qassim Khoei and Mohammad Hussaini Shirazi.

References

 http://www.smb-shirazi.com/farsi/

External links
 المرجع السيد محمد باقر الشيرازي والعلامة الشيخ علي الكوراني والعلامة الشيخ محمد باقر المقدسي
السيد محمد باقر الشيرازي

See also
List of Maraji

Iranian grand ayatollahs
Iranian Islamists
Shia Islamists
1931 births
2014 deaths
Burials at Imam Reza Shrine